Hotath Neerar Jonnyo is a 2004 Bengali film directed by director Subrata Sen. It is based on a short story Rani O Abinash by noted novelist Sunil Gangopadhyay.

Plot
Rani (Ghosh) is a housewife with a successful husband, Tapas, and a kid. Living a routine existence, Rani looks after her family and attend her dance classes. One day her old friend from college Abinash (Ghosh) comes into her life. Abinash is a renowned musician today and has been travelling around the world. Abinash says to Rani that he has had relationships with a few women, but cannot offer himself up fully because the memory of Rani stands in his way. He asks her to spend a day with him so that he can get over her. Abinash also has a girlfriend Tina who is in love with him. Rani, torn between principles and passion, succumbs to Abinash's persistence. This creates havoc in her personal life while Abinash, his goal complete, moves away from her.

Cast
Bikram Ghosh
Jaya Ghosh
Arindam Sil
Tina Majumdar
Saptarshi Dasgupta

References

Bengali-language Indian films
Films directed by Subrata Sen
2000s Bengali-language films
Films based on works by Sunil Gangopadhyay
Films scored by Bickram Ghosh